Arthur Lynch fitz Andrew, Mayor of Galway, 1539–40.

Lynch was a son of Andrew Lynch whose failed attempt to connect the lower Corrib with Lough Atalia in 1498 was called Lynch's Folly. Arthur died in office, though the date is not precisely known. His brother, John Lynch fitz Andrew, served as Mayor for the term 1528–29.

See also
 Tribes of Galway

References
History of Galway, James Hardiman, Galway, 1820.
Old Galway, Maureen Donovan O'Sullivan, 1942.
Henry, William (2002). Role of Honour: The Mayors of Galway City 1485-2001. Galway: Galway City Council.  
 Martyn, Adrian (2016). The Tribes of Galway: 1124-1642

Politicians from County Galway
Mayors of Galway
Year of death unknown
Year of birth unknown
16th-century Irish businesspeople